Shuko Aoyama and Rika Fujiwara were the defending Champions, but lost to Caroline Garcia and Michaëlla Krajicek in the semifinals.

Makoto Ninomiya and Riko Sawayanagi won the title, defeating Caroline Garcia and Michaëlla Krajicek in the final by a Walkover.

Seeds

Draw

Draw

References
 Main Draw

Dunlop World Challenge - Doubles
Dunlop World Challenge
2011 Dunlop World Challenge